List of poets who have written much of their poetry in Polish. See also Discussion Page for additional poets not listed here.

There have been five Polish-language Nobel Prize laureates in literature: Henryk Sienkiewicz, Władysław Reymont, Czesław Miłosz, Wisława Szymborska and Olga Tokarczuk. Two of them have been poets (Miłosz and Szymborska).

A
 Franciszka Arnsztajnowa (1865–1942)
 Adam Asnyk (1838–1897)

B
 Krzysztof Kamil Baczyński (1921–1944)
 Józef Baka (1707–1780)
 Edward Balcerzan (born 1937) 
 Stanisław Baliński (1899–1984)
 Marcin Baran (born 1963)
 Stanisław Barańczak (1946–2014), Nike Award winner
 Miron Białoszewski (1922–1983)
 Zbigniew Bieńkowski (1913–1994)
 Biernat of Lublin (1465?– after 1529)
 Tadeusz Borowski (1922–1951)
 Tadeusz Boy-Żeleński (1874–1941)
 Władysław Broniewski (1897–1962)
 Jerzy Braun (1907–1975)
 Jan Brzechwa (1898–1966)
 Teodor Bujnicki (1904–1944)
 Andrzej Bursa (1932–1957)

C
 Józef Czechowicz (1903–1939)
 Tytus Czyżewski (1880–1945)

D
 Jacek Dehnel (born 1980) 
 Elżbieta Drużbacka (1695 or 1698 – 1765)

E
 Leszek Engelking (born 1955)

F
 Jerzy Ficowski, (1924–2006)
 Aleksander Fredro (1793–1876)

G
 Tadeusz Gajcy (1922–1944)
 Konstanty Ildefons Gałczyński (1905–1953)
 Stefan Garczyński (1690–1756)
 Cezary Geroń (1960–1998)
 Zuzanna Ginczanka (1917–1944)
 Cyprian Godebski (1765–1809)
 Stanisław Grochowiak (1934–1976)
 Wioletta Grzegorzewska (born 1974)

H
 Julia Hartwig (1921–2017)
 Marian Hemar (1901–1972) 
 Zbigniew Herbert (1924–1998), one of the best known and the most translated post-war Polish writers

I
 Maria Ilnicka (1825 or 1827–1897)
 Wacław Iwaniuk (1912–2001)
 Jarosław Iwaszkiewicz (1894–1980)

J
 Klemens Janicki (1516–1543) 
 Bruno Jasieński (1901–1938)
 Mieczysław Jastrun (1903–1983)

K
 Anna Kamieńska (1920–1986)
 Franciszek Karpiński (1741–1825)
 Jan Kasprowicz (1860–1936)
 Maria Kazecka (1880–1938)
 Andrzej Tadeusz Kijowski (born 1954)
 Franciszek Dionizy Kniaźnin (1750–1807)
 Jan Kochanowski (1530–1584), considered the "father of Polish poetry" and the greatest Slavic poet prior to the 19th century
 Halina Konopacka (1900–1989)
 Maria Konopnicka (1842–1910)
 Stanisław Korab-Brzozowski, (1876–1901)
 Julian Kornhauser (born 1946)
 Apollo Korzeniowski (1820–1869), father of Polish-British novelist Joseph Conrad
 Urszula Kozioł (born 1931)
 Ignacy Krasicki (1735–1801)
 Zygmunt Krasiński (1812–1859), one of the Three Bards of Polish literature
 Katarzyna Krenz (born 1953)
 Józef Krupiński (1930–1998)
 Ryszard Krynicki (born 1943)
 Andrzej Krzycki (1482–1537)
 Paweł Kubisz (1907–1968)
 Jalu Kurek (1904–1983)
 Mira Kuś (born 1958)

L
 Antoni Lange (1863–1929)
 Stanisław Jerzy Lec, (1909–1966)
 Joanna Lech (born 1984)
 Jan Lechoń (1899–1956)
 Krystyna Lenkowska (born 1957)
 Bolesław Leśmian (1877–1937)
 Jerzy Liebert (1904–1931)
 Ewa Lipska (born 1945)
 Stanisław Herakliusz Lubomirski (1641–1702)

Ł
 Henryka Łazowertówna (1909–1942)
 Józef Łobodowski (1909–1988)

M
 Antoni Malczewski (1793–1826)
 Marcin Malek (born 1975)
 Jakobe Mansztajn (born 1982) 
 Tadeusz Miciński (1873–1918)
 Adam Mickiewicz (1798–1855), considered Poland's national poet and a leading figure of European romanticism
 Grażyna Miller (1957–2009)
 Czesław Miłosz (1911–2004), Nobel Prize in Literature
 Stanisław Młodożeniec (1895–1959)
 Jan Andrzej Morsztyn (1621–1693)
 Zbigniew Morsztyn (1628–1689)

N
 Daniel Naborowski (1573–1640)
 Adam Naruszewicz (1733–1796)
 Julian Ursyn Niemcewicz (1758–1841)
 Cyprian Kamil Norwid (1821–1883)
 Franciszek Nowicki (1864–1935)

O
 Antoni Edward Odyniec (1804–1885)
 Artur Oppman (1867–1931)
 Władysław Orkan (1875–1930)
 Agnieszka Osiecka (1936–1997)

P
 Leon Pasternak (1910–1969)
 Maria Pawlikowska-Jasnorzewska (1891–1945)
 Jacek Podsiadło (born 1964)
 Wincenty Pol (1807–1872)
 Halina Poświatowska (1935–1967)
 Wacław Potocki (1621–1696)
 Kazimierz Przerwa-Tetmajer a.k.a. Kazimierz Tetmajer (1865–1940)
 Zenon Przesmycki (1861–1944)
 Jeremi Przybora (1915–2004)

R
 Mikołaj Rej (1505–1569)
 Sydor Rey (1908–1979)
 Barbara Rosiek (born 1959)
 Tadeusz Różewicz (1921–2014), Nike Award winner
 Tomasz Różycki (born 1970) 
 Zygmunt Rumel (1915–1943)
 Lucjan Rydel (1870–1918)
 Jarosław Marek Rymkiewicz (born 1935), Nike Award winner

S
 Maciej Kazimierz Sarbiewski (1595–1640)
 Władysław Sebyła (1902–1940)
 Mikołaj Sęp Szarzyński (1550–1581)
 Jan Stanisław Skorupski (born 1938)
 Antoni Słonimski (1895–1976)
 Juliusz Słowacki (1809–1849), regarded as of the Three Bards of Polish literature
 Edward Stachura (1937–1979)
 Anatol Stern (1899–1968)
 Leopold Staff (1878–1957)
 Anna Stanisławska (1651–1701)
 Andrzej Stasiuk (born 1960)
 Anatol Stern (1899–1968)
 Marcin Świetlicki (born 1961)
 Anna Świrszczyńska (1909–1984)
 Władysław Syrokomla (1823–1862)
 Lola Szereszewska (1895–1943)
 Janusz Szpotański (1929–2001)
 Włodzimierz Szymanowicz (1946–1967)
 Wisława Szymborska (1923–2012), Nobel Prize in Literature
 Szymon Szymonowic (1558–1629)

T
 Eugeniusz Tkaczyszyn-Dycki (born 1962), Nike Award winner
 Julian Tuwim (1894–1953)
 Jan Twardowski (1915–2006)

U
 Kornel Ujejski (1823–1897)

W
 Aleksander Wat (1900–1967)
 Adam Ważyk (1905–1982)
 Kazimierz Wierzyński (1894–1969)
 Stanisław Ignacy Witkiewicz a.k.a. "Witkacy" (1885–1939)
 Stefan Witwicki (1801–1847)
 Rafał Wojaczek (1945–1971)
 Grażyna Wojcieszko (born 1957) 
 Maryla Wolska (1873–1930)
 Józef Wybicki (1747–1822), author of the National Anthem of Poland
 Stanisław Wyspiański (1869–1907)

Z
 Tymon Zaborowski (1799–1828)
 Adam Zagajewski (1945–2021)
 Józef Bohdan Zaleski (1802–1886)
 Wacław Michał Zaleski (1799–1849)
 Kazimiera Zawistowska (1870–1902)
 Piotr Zbylitowski (1569–1649)
 Emil Zegadłowicz (1888–1941)
 Katarzyna Ewa Zdanowicz-Cyganiak (born 1979)
 Narcyza Żmichowska (1819–1876), a precursor of feminism in Poland
 Jerzy Żuławski (1874–1915)
 Juliusz Żuławski (1910–1999)
 Eugeniusz Żytomirski (1911–1975)

References

See also
List of Polish-language authors
 List of Poles

Polish
 
Poets